Tributyltin azide is an organotin compound with the formula (C4H9)3SnN3. It is a colorless solid although older samples can appear as yellow oils.  The compound is used as a reagent in organic synthesis.

Synthesis and reactions
Tributyltin azide is synthesized by the salt metathesis reaction of tributyltin chloride and sodium azide.

It is a reagent used in the synthesis of tetrazoles, which in turn are used to generate angiotensin II receptor antagonists.  In some applications, tributyltin azide has been replaced by the less toxic trioctyltin azide and organoaluminium azides.

Safety
Lower alkyl tin compounds are often highly toxic and have penetrating odors.  Tributyltin azide causes skin rashes, itching or blisters.

References

Organotin compounds
Azido compounds
Reagents for organic chemistry
Tin(IV) compounds
Butyl compounds